Sindhoora Thilaka is a 1992 Indian Kannada language film directed by Om Sai Prakash, starring Sunil and Malashri. The supporting cast features Shruti, Jaggesh and Abhijeeth. The music was composed by Upendra Kumar.

The film was a remake of the Tamil film Kizhakku Vasal directed by R. V. Udayakumar.

Cast

 Sunil
 Malashri
 Shruti
 Jaggesh
 Mukhyamantri Chandru
 Abhijeeth
 Jai Jagadish
 Umashri
 Asha Rani
 Padma Kumuta
 Om Sai Prakash

Soundtrack

Upendra Kumar composed the film's background score and music for the soundtracks. The lyrics were written by R. N. Jayagopal. The album consists of six tracks.

References

1992 films
1990s Kannada-language films
Films scored by Upendra Kumar
Kannada remakes of Tamil films
Films directed by Sai Prakash